The After Moon Show was a Pakistani prime time talk show hosted by Yasir Hussain on Hum TV. The show premiered on 10 February 2018. It was produced by Hum Television Network. The show is hosted by film, theater and television actor Yasir L, in his debut as a television host.

Seasons
Season 1 of the show premiered on 10 February 2018 and concluded on 17 June 2018 with an Eid Special finale episode.
Season 2 started on 14 July 2018 in the same time slot.

Format

The show was divided into six segments. Chit Chat Couch Session had Yasir in conversation with the guests. Chai Ya Thanda challenged celebrities with interesting riddles and they were given brain boosters if they got stuck. The Puppet segment had a puppet character who liked to share jokes which were silly but he thought they were funny. Kathera was a segment where celebrities had to stand in a katehra (witness box) and clarify funny accusations put on them by the public which were asked by Yasir.  Urta Teer was another segment where rapid fire questions were aimed at celebrities who had to give quick answers. Two Minutes of Fame invited a new singer on every show who had a chance to showcase his talent.

Episodes

Season 1

Season 2

Reception
The show garnered positive response from the public and critics. It is termed as a "light hearted evening show". From episode 1 the ratings were high enough to beat competitive channels including ARY Digital and GEO TV.

References

Pakistani television talk shows
2018 Pakistani television series debuts